Falguni Rahman (born 24 August 1997) is a Bangladeshi film actress and model. Rahman started her career with 2016's Jaaz Multimedia production Angaar. Subsequently, she worked on Niyoti opposite Arifin Shuvoo.

Filmography

References

External links 

 

Living people
People from Dhaka
21st-century Bangladeshi actresses
Bangladeshi film actresses
1996 births